Salvia coahuilensis is a perennial shrub native to the Sierra Madre Oriental in the Mexican state of Coahuila. It is a low-growing evergreen, under 2.5 ft in height and width, with many woody branches growing from the base. It has 1 in long beet-purple flowers, and 1 in long widely spaced, linear olive-green leaves.

Notes

coahuilensis
Endemic flora of Mexico
Flora of the Sierra Madre Oriental